The men's 1500 metres event at the 2013 Asian Athletics Championships was held at the Shree Shiv Chhatrapati Sports Complex. The final took place on 5 July.

Medalists

Results

Heats
First 5 in each heat (Q) and 2 best performers (q) advanced to the semifinals.

Final

References
Results

1500 Men's
1500 metres at the Asian Athletics Championships